Karl Willy Wagner (22 February 1883 – 4 September 1953) was a German pioneer in the theory of electronic filters.  He is noted by Hendrik Bode as being one of two Germans whose;

The other German being referred to is Wilhelm Cauer.  Wagner was the second referee on Cauer's milestone 1926 thesis but Wagner fell out with Cauer in 1942 after he refused to support Wagner's research proposals with the German Society of Electrical Engineers (Verband der Elektrotechnik - the VDE).

Wagner was removed from office in 1936 because he refused to dismiss his Jewish employees.

See also
Analogue filter
Maxwell–Wagner–Sillars polarization

References

1883 births
1953 deaths
People from Friedrichsdorf
German electrical engineers
People from Hesse-Nassau
Knights Commander of the Order of Merit of the Federal Republic of Germany
Engineers from Hesse